Mălini is a commune located in Suceava County, Romania. It is composed of five villages: Iesle, Mălini, Pâraie, Poiana Mărului and Văleni-Stânișoara.

Administration and local politics

Communal council 

The commune's current local council has the following political composition, according to the results of the 2020 Romanian local elections:

Natives 

 Teodor Ilincăi
 Nicolae Labiș
 Epifanie Norocel

References

Communes in Suceava County
Localities in Western Moldavia